The R810 road is a regional road in south Dublin, Ireland connecting Cornmarket to the Naas Road (N7).

It begins near the Coombe and goes west until it becomes Tyrconnell Road, when it turns southwest. Shortly afterwards, when it crosses the Grand Canal, it becomes the Naas Road and continues southwest to the M50 motorway, at the Red Cow interchange, where it becomes the N7.

The official definition of the R810 from the Roads Act 1993 (Classification of Regional Roads) Order 2006  states:

R810: Cornmarket - Inchicore, Dublin

Between its junction with R108 at Bridge Street in the city of Dublin and its junction with R110 at Long Mile Road in the county of South Dublin via Cornmarket, Thomas Street West, James Street, Mount Brown, Old Kilmainham, Emmett Road, Tyrconnell Road and Naas Road in the city of Dublin; and Naas Road in the county of South Dublin.

See also
Roads in Ireland
National primary road
Regional road

References

Regional roads in the Republic of Ireland
Roads in County Dublin